Ramadi is a district in Al Anbar Governorate, Iraq. It is centred on the city of Ramadi.

Cities
Ramadi (400,000)
Sajariyah  (20,000)
Hamariyah (15,000)
Husaibah Al Sharqiah (35,000)
Albu Faraj (30,000)
Aljbah (25,000)

Districts of Al Anbar Governorate